Ormosia ormondii, commonly known as yellow bean, is a medium sized tree up to  in height in the pea and bean family Fabaceae. The leaves are compound with up to 9 leaflets. Masses of pink flowers are produced on axillary panicles from October to December.

Taxonomy
This species was first described in 1882 by the Victorian Government Botanist Ferdinand von Mueller as Podopetalum ormondii. In 1943 the American botanist Elmer Drew Merrill published a description in the journal Sargentia, in which he moved it to the genus Ormosia.

Conservation
This species is listed by the Queensland Department of Environment and Science as least concern. , it has not been assessed by the IUCN.

References

External links
 
 
 View a map of historical sightings of this species at the Australasian Virtual Herbarium
 View observations of this species on iNaturalist
 View images of this species on Flickriver

ormondii
Endemic flora of Queensland
Taxa named by Elmer Drew Merrill
Plants described in 1943